The Hidee Gold Mine is a former gold mine in Gilpin County, Colorado, United States. The Hyde Gold Mine was submitted for patent in 1896 and in the early 1980's the mine owner decide to start giving educational tours. It is one of the tourist attractions in and near the town as a result of the efforts of the local residents, and the Hidee Gold Mine company which worked to recreate the history of mining near Black Hawk, Colorado. There are tours of the mine, which explain the methods that were used both in the past as well as the present. Also during these tours, tourists are given a feel of being a miner, by including a stop at a gold ore vein where tourists use a single-jack (one-handed) hammer and chisel (provided) to chip a gold ore sample loose, which they are allowed to keep as a souvenir. It has also been open since 1988.

External links
Official website
Travel.nytimes.com
Cbs4denver.com

Buildings and structures in Gilpin County, Colorado
Mining museums in Colorado
Museums in Gilpin County, Colorado

References